Miranda is a Spanish, Portuguese, Sephardic Jewish, Italian and Maltese surname of Latin origin, meaning "worthy of admiration".

Notable people with the surname Miranda include:

Sports
 David Miranda (cyclist) (born 1942), Salvadoran cyclist
 Denok Miranda (born 1982), Filipino basketball player
 Enílton (Enílton Menezes de Miranda, born 1977), Brazilian footballer
 Edison Miranda (born 1981), Colombian boxer
 Gabriel Miranda (born 1968), Venezuelan footballer
 George Miranda dos Santos (born 1977), Brazilian footballer
 Gonzalo Miranda (born 1979), Chilean track and road cyclist
 Jimmy Miranda, a member of the WWE ring crew who died in 2002 and for whom The Ultimate Warrior suggested a Jimmy Miranda Award be created
 José Miranda (baseball) (born 1998), Puerto Rican baseball player
 Leandro Costa Miranda Moraes (born 1983), Brazilian football player
 Leandro Gil Miranda da Silva (born 1978), Brazilian football player
 Luís Mário Miranda da Silva (born 1976), Brazilian footballer
 Márcio Miranda (born 1942), Brazilian chess master
 Marcos Miranda (born 1992), Brazilian footballer
 Miguel Ángel Miranda (born 1983), Venezuelan boxer
 Michael Miranda (born 1990), Filipino basketball player
 Miranda (footballer, born 1984) (João Miranda de Souza Filho, born 1984), Brazilian footballer
 Patricia Miranda (born 1979), American wrestler
 Rafael Miranda da Conceição (born 1984), Brazilian footballer
 Richard Garcia Miranda (born 1975), Brazilian footballer
 Roberto Miranda (born 1944), Brazilian footballer
 Willy Miranda (1926–1996), Cuban-American baseball player
 Zito (footballer, born 1932) (José Ely de Miranda, 1932–2015), Brazilian footballer

Others
 Ana Miranda Paz (born 1971), Spanish politician
 Ana Miranda (born 1951), Brazilian writer
 Aurora Miranda (1915–2005), Brazilian singer and motion picture star, sister of Carmen Miranda
 Carlo Miranda (1912–1982), Italian mathematician
 Carmen Miranda (1909–1955), Portuguese-Brazilian singer and motion picture star, popularly known for wearing fruit headdresses
 Cecilia Miranda de Carvalho (1913–2011), Brazilian singer, sister of Carmen Miranda
 Chyno Miranda (Jesús Alberto Miranda Pérez, born 1984), Venezuelan singer, part of Chino & Nacho
 David Martins Miranda (1936–2015), Brazilian pastor
 David Miranda (politician) (born 1985), Brazilian politician
 Ernesto Miranda (1941–1976), defendant and appellant of Miranda v. Arizona, the case that was the basis of the Miranda warning
 Eurico Miranda (1944–2019), Brazilian politician and president of CR Vasco da Gama
 Eva Miranda, Spanish mathematician
 Flix Miranda, American engineer
 Francisco de Miranda (1750-1816), Venezuelan revolutionary who is regarded as a forerunner of Simón Bolívar and other revolutionaries
 Frank de Miranda (1913–1986), Dutch sculptor, psychologist and publicist
 Giovanni Miranda (16th century), Italian Hispanist and grammarian
 Isa Miranda (1909–1982), Italian actress
 Isabel Miranda de Wallace (born 1951) Mexican social activist
 Ismael Miranda (1950–), Puerto Rican salsa singer
 José Luis de Jesús Miranda (1946–2013), cult leader, Messiah claimant, founder of Creciendo en Gracia (Growing in Grace International Ministry)
 João Bernardo de Miranda (born 1952), Angolan politician and diplomat
 Juan Carreño de Miranda (1614–1685), Spanish painter
 Juan García de Miranda (1677–1749), Spanish painter of the baroque period, a disciple of Juan Delgado and appointed Painter to the King
 Julius Caesar de Miranda (1906-1956), first Prime Minister of Suriname 
 Lin-Manuel Miranda (born 1980), actor, composer and lyricist (In the Heights, Hamilton)
 Mario Miranda, (1926–2011), Indian cartoonist and painter
 Miguel Darío Miranda y Gómez (1895–1986), Mexican clergyman
 Miriam Miranda, Honduran human rights activist
 Nicolás Zúñiga y Miranda (1865–1925), Mexican eccentric who was famous for being a perennial presidential candidate
 Pedro Rodriguez de Miranda (1696–1766) Spanish painter of the late-Baroque period, nephew of Juan Garcia de Miranda, and related to several other de Miranda artists
 Pia Miranda (born 1973), Australian actress
 Rafael Cancel Miranda (1930–2020), political activist, member of the Puerto Rican Nationalist Party
 Ricardo Miranda (born 1976), Canadian politician
 Robert Miranda (born 1952), Bishop of Roman Catholic Diocese of Gulbarga,India
 Roberta Miranda (born 1956), Brazilian singer
 Ronaldo Miranda (born 1948), Brazilian composer
 Roxana Miranda (born 1967), candidate for presidency of Chile
 Sula Miranda (born 1963), Brazilian singer, TV presenter and writer
 Thammy Miranda (born 1982), Brazilian entertainer and politician

Portuguese-language surnames
Spanish-language surnames